Baron Thomson of Fleet, of Northbridge in the City of Edinburgh, is a title in the Peerage of the United Kingdom. It was created in 1964 for Roy Thomson, a Canadian-born newspaper magnate. He was succeeded in 1976 by his son, the second baron. , the title is held by the first Baron's grandson, the third Baron, who succeeded his father in 2006.

Barons Thomson of Fleet (1964) 
 Roy Herbert Thomson, 1st Baron Thomson of Fleet (1894–1976)
 Kenneth Roy Thomson, 2nd Baron Thomson of Fleet (1923–2006)
 David Kenneth Roy Thomson, 3rd Baron Thomson of Fleet (b. 1957)

The heir to this title is the present holder's son, the Hon. Benjamin James Ludwick Thomson (b. 2006)

Line of Succession

  Roy Herbert Thomson, 1st Baron Thomson of Fleet (1894—1976)
  Kenneth Roy Thomson, 2nd Baron Thomson of Fleet (1923—2006)
  David Kenneth Roy Thomson, 3rd Baron Thomson of Fleet (born 1957)
 (1) Hon. Benjamin James  Ludwick Thomson (b. 2006)
 (2) Hon. Peter John Thomson (b. 1965)

Arms

References

Additional sources 
 Kidd, Charles, Williamson, David (editors). Debrett's Peerage and Baronetage (1990 edition). New York: St Martin's Press, 1990, 
 

Baronies in the Peerage of the United Kingdom
Noble titles created in 1964
Thomson family